Afro-Portuguese, African-Portuguese, or Black Portuguese are Portuguese citizens or residents of Portugal with total or partial ancestry from any of the Sub-Saharan ethnic groups of Africa. Most of those perceived as Afro-Portuguese trace their ancestry to former Portuguese overseas colonies in Africa, but Black Brazilians living in Portugal are also sometimes included.

Alternatively, Afro-Portuguese may also refer to various populations of Portuguese descent, to various degrees, living throughout Africa, often speaking Portuguese or Portuguese creole, the Luso-Africans or Portuguese Africans, often also adopting Portuguese cultural norms, from which the Black Portuguese population in Portugal often derive.

History 

Black Portuguese citizens are descendants or migrants issuing from the former Portuguese African colonies, (Angola, Guinea-Bissau, São Tomé and Príncipe, Cape Verde and Mozambique), even if residual numbers originate in other Sub-Saharan African countries. The colonies were abolished in 1951, transformed into overseas provinces by the Estado Novo regime and became integral parts of Portugal.

These communities arrived in Portugal after the independence of the African overseas provinces, in 1974–75, mainly after the Portuguese economic growth of the second half of the 1980s. They should not be confused with the population, overwhelmingly white Europeans born in Portugal, that "returned" from the same colonies immediately after their independence, the so-called retornados — Portuguese settlers and descendants of Portuguese settlers born in former African colonies who relocated to Portugal after independence and in second half of the 1980s.

According to the Portuguese Foreigners and Borders Services, in 2006, this is the breakdown of Africans legally in Portugal: (see table)

The Portuguese nationality law privileges Jus sanguinis and a sizable number of Black-Africans in Portugal maintained their respective nationality of origin. Even if the nationality law of 1959 was based on the principle of Jus soli, the changes made in 1975 and 1981 changed it to a Jus sanguinis law after the independence of the African provinces, which denied naturalization not only to first generation migrants, but also to their children and grandchildren. Still this legislation had special clauses: Portuguese nationality was granted to citizens proceeding from Brazil, Angola, Cape Verde, Guinea-Bissau, São Tomé and Príncipe and East Timor, as well as those born under Portuguese administration in Goa, Daman and Diu and Macau if legally living in Portugal for six years. All other migrants need to live in the country for a period of ten years.

A new 2006 law granted Portuguese nationality to the second generation, if living in Portugal for at least five years. It also removed differences between countries of origin, given the influx of immigrants from Eastern Europe, most notably Ukrainians. The law was announced in 2005 by Prime minister José Sócrates and granted Portuguese nationality to children born in Portugal of foreign parents, as he stated: "those children did not spoke another language other than Portuguese and only studied in Portuguese schools, but had nationality denied." In 2015, Francisca Van Dunem became the first black Portuguese minister in the Portuguese government.

The arrival of these black Africans in Portugal, coupled with their difficulty in accessing full citizenship, enhanced, from the 1970s onwards, the processes of ethnic and racial discrimination. This is the result of multiple factors, from institutional and juridical, to socio-cultural (the construction of stereotypical ethno-racial differences), residential (with the concentration of black migrants in degraded ghettos in Lisbon area, although this does not occur elsewhere in the country) and economical (the poorly qualified professional and educational profile of the migrants). coupled with a parallel strengthening of black identity in African migrants, even surpassing national origins. In 2016, the UN committee on the Elimination of Racial Discrimination visited Portugal and recommended that Portugal implement specific measures for the Afro-descendent community, in as in cases where some black Portuguese, today full adults, are without citizenship even in cases where siblings can be full Portuguese citizens, such as those born before 1981 or after their  parents become legal migrants.

Notable Afro-Portuguese
 André Vidigal
 Ariza Makukula (Congolese naturalized Portuguese)
 Bebé
 Bruno Paz
 David Sualehe
 Félix Correia
 Florentino Luis
 Luís
Nani
 Nilton Varela
 Nuno
 Nuno Tavares
Bruno Alves
 Renato Sanches
Ricardo Vaz Tê
Costinha
Grada Kilomba
 Luís Boa Morte
Silvestre Varela
Roderick Miranda
 Ruben Vezo
Jack Paulo Model
Viriato Pã
 Eusébio
 Fábio Carvalho
 Rafael Leão
 Tiago Djaló
 Ivan Cavaleiro
 Ricardo Batista
 Rudy
 Silvestre Varela
Tiago Tomás
 Tomás Tavares
 David Tavares
 João Paulo

See also

Angolans in Portugal
Cape Verdeans in Portugal
Mozambicans in Portugal
Bissau-Guineans in Portugal
Nhara

References

 
Ethnic groups in Portugal
 
Portuguese